Margit H. Sipos (born 12 October 1908) was a Hungarian swimmer who won a bronze medal in the 4 × 100 m freestyle relay at the 1931 European Aquatics Championships. She competed in the 100 m freestyle event at the 1928 Summer Olympics, but did not reach the finals.

References

1908 births
Year of death missing
Swimmers from Budapest
Swimmers at the 1928 Summer Olympics
Olympic swimmers of Hungary
Hungarian female swimmers
European Aquatics Championships medalists in swimming
Hungarian female freestyle swimmers
20th-century Hungarian women